This list of Andrena species is an almost comprehensive listing of species of the mining bees belonging to the genus Andrena.

A

 Andrena abbreviata Dours, 1873
 Andrena aberrans Eversmann, 1852
 Andrena abjecta Pérez, 1895
 Andrena ablegata (Cockerell, 1922)
 Andrena abrupta Warncke, 1967
 Andrena aburana Hirashima, 1962
 Andrena accepta Viereck, 1916 – two-spotted miner bee
 Andrena acerba Warncke, 1967
 Andrena aciculata Morawitz, 1886
 Andrena acrana Warncke, 1967
 Andrena aculeata LaBerge, 1980 – spiny miner bee
 Andrena acutilabris Morawitz, 1876
 Andrena adjacens Morawitz, 1876
 Andrena aegyptiaca Friese, 1899
 Andrena aegypticola Friese, 1922
 Andrena aeneiventris Morawitz, 1872
 Andrena aerifera LaBerge, 1967
 Andrena aerinifrons Dours, 1873
 Andrena aeripes LaBerge, 1967
 Andrena aetherea Warncke, 1974
 Andrena afghana Warncke, 1974
 Andrena afimbriata LaBerge, 1967
 Andrena afrensis Warncke, 1967
 Andrena africana Friese, 1909
 Andrena agilis Smith, 1879
 Andrena agilissima (Scopoli, 1770)
 Andrena agnata Warncke, 1967
 Andrena agoseridis Thorp, 1969
 Andrena ahenea Morawitz, 1876
 Andrena aiderensis Osytshnjuk, 1993
 Andrena ailisensis Osytshnjuk, 1993
 Andrena aino Tadauchi, Hirashima & Matsumura, 1987
 Andrena akitsushimae Tadauchi & Hirashima, 1984
 Andrena alamonis Viereck, 1917
 Andrena alashanica Popov, 1949
 Andrena albicaudata Hirashima, 1966
 Andrena albiculta Viereck, 1917
 Andrena albifacies Alfken, 1927
 Andrena albopicta Radoszkowski, 1874
 Andrena albopunctata (Rossi, 1792)
 Andrena albuginosa (Viereck, 1904)
 Andrena alceae LaBerge, 1986
 Andrena alchata Warncke, 1974
 Andrena alfkenella Perkins, 1914
 Andrena alfkenelloides Warncke, 1965
 Andrena algida Smith, 1853 – icy miner bee
 Andrena aliciae Robertson, 1891 – yellow-faced miner bee
 Andrena aliciarum Cockerell, 1897
 Andrena alijevi Osytshnjuk, 1986
 Andrena alleghaniensis Viereck, 1907 – Appalachian miner bee
 Andrena allosa Warncke, 1975
 Andrena alluaudi Benoist, 1961
 Andrena almas Tadauchi, Miyanaga & Dawut, 2005
 Andrena altaica Lebedev, 1932
 Andrena alutacea Stoeckhert, 1942
 Andrena amamiensis Hirashima, 1960
 Andrena amarilla Cockerell, 1949
 Andrena amicula Warncke, 1967
 Andrena amieti Praz, Müller & Genoud, 2019
 Andrena amoena Morawitz, 1876
 Andrena amphibola (Viereck, 1904) – amphibious miner bee
 Andrena ampla Warncke, 1967
 Andrena anatolica Alfken, 1935
 Andrena anatolis Linsley & MacSwain, 1961
 Andrena andrenoides (Cresson, 1878) – colourful willow miner bee 
 Andrena angarensis Cockerell, 1929
 Andrena angelesia Timberlake, 1951
 Andrena angustella Cockerell, 1936
 Andrena angusticrus LaBerge, 1971
 Andrena angustifovea Viereck, 1904
 Andrena angustior (Kirby, 1802)
 Andrena angustitarsata Viereck, 1904 – narrow-legged miner bee
 Andrena anisochlora Cockerell, 1936
 Andrena annapurna Tadauchi & Matsumura, 2007
 Andrena annectens Ribble, 1968
 Andrena anograe Cockerell, 1901
 Andrena anonyma Cameron, 1897
 Andrena anthracina Morawitz, 1880
 Andrena anthrisci Blüthgen, 1925
 Andrena antigana Pérez, 1895
 †Andrena antoinei Michez & De Meulemeester, 2014
 Andrena antonitonis Viereck & Cockerell, 1914
 Andrena anzu Tadauchi & Hirashima, 1987
 Andrena apacheorum Cockerell, 1897
 Andrena apasta Linsley & MacSwain, 1961
 Andrena apicata Smith, 1847
 Andrena apiformis Kreichbaumer, 1873
 Andrena aquila LaBerge, 1971
 Andrena arabica Scheuchl & Gusenleitner, 2007
 Andrena arabis Robertson, 1897 – mustard miner bee 
 Andrena arctostaphylae Ribble, 1968
 Andrena ardis LaBerge, 1967
 Andrena arenata Osytshnjuk, 1983
 Andrena arenicola LaBerge & Ribble, 1972
 Andrena argemonis Cockerell, 1896
 Andrena argentata Smith, 1844
 Andrena argentiscopa Viereck, 1917
 Andrena argyreofasciata Schmiedeknecht, 1900
 Andrena arima Cameron, 1909
 Andrena armeniaca Popov, 1940
 Andrena arsinoe Schmiedeknecht, 1900
 Andrena aruana Warncke, 1967
 Andrena asiatica Friese, 1921
 Andrena aspericollis Pérez, 1895
 Andrena asperrima Pérez, 1895
 Andrena asperula Osytshnjuk, 1977
 Andrena assimilis Radoszkowski, 1876
 Andrena asteris Robertson, 1891 – aster miner bee
 Andrena asteroides Mitchell, 1960
 Andrena astica Warncke, 1967
 Andrena astragali Viereck & Cockerell, 1914 – death camas miner bee
 Andrena astrella Warncke, 1975
 Andrena athenensis Warncke, 1965
 Andrena atlantica Mitchell, 1960
 Andrena atrata Friese, 1887
 Andrena atrohirta Morawitz, 1894
 Andrena atrotegularis Hedicke, 1923
 Andrena atypica (Cockerell, 1941)
 Andrena auricoma Smith, 1879
 Andrena auriculata Xu & Tadauchi, 2006 – golden-haired miner bee
 Andrena aurihirta Donovan, 1977
 Andrena auripes LaBerge, 1967
 Andrena austroinsularis Tadauchi & Hirashima, 1983
 Andrena autumnalis Viereck & Cockerell, 1914
 Andrena avara Warncke, 1967
 Andrena avulsa LaBerge & Ribble, 1972
 Andrena azerbaidshanica Lebedev, 1932

B

 Andrena babai Tadauchi & Hirashima, 1987
 Andrena baeriae Timberlake, 1941
 Andrena bairacumensis Morawitz, 1876
 Andrena balsamorhizae LaBerge, 1967
 Andrena balucha Nurse, 1904
 Andrena banffensis Viereck, 1924
 Andrena banksi Malloch, 1917
 Andrena barbara Bouseman & LaBerge, 1979
 Andrena barbareae Panzer, 1805
 Andrena barberi Cockerell, 1898
 Andrena barbilabris (Kirby, 1802) – bearded miner bee
 Andrena basifusca Cockerell, 1930
 Andrena basimacula Alfken, 1929
 Andrena bassana Warncke, 1969
 Andrena batangensis Xu, 1994
 Andrena bayona Warncke, 1975
 Andrena beameri LaBerge, 1967
 Andrena beijingensis Xu, 1994
 Andrena bellidis Pérez, 1895
 Andrena bellidoides LaBerge, 1968
 Andrena bendensis Donovan, 1977
 Andrena benefica Hirashima, 1962
 Andrena bengasinensis Schulthess, 1924
 Andrena bentoni Cockerell, 1917
 Andrena berberidis Cockerell, 1905 – barberry miner bee
 Andrena berkeleyi Viereck & Cockerell, 1914
 Andrena bernardina Linsley, 1938
 Andrena bernicla Warncke, 1975
 Andrena biareola LaBerge, 1971
 Andrena biarmica Warncke, 1975
 Andrena bicarinata Morawitz, 1876
 Andrena bicolor Fabricius, 1775
 Andrena bicolorata (Rossi, 1790)
 Andrena biemarginata Nurse, 1904
 Andrena bifida Warncke, 1967
 Andrena biguttata Friese, 1923
 Andrena bilavia Osytshnjuk, 1994
 Andrena bilimeki LaBerge, 1967
 Andrena bimaculata (Kirby, 1802)
 Andrena binominata Smith, 1853
 Andrena birtwelli Cockerell, 1901 – Birtwell's miner bee
 Andrena bisalicis Viereck, 1908 – eastern willow miner bee
 Andrena biscutellata Viereck, 1917
 Andrena biskrensis Pérez, 1895
 Andrena bisulcata Morawitz, 1877
 Andrena blaisdelli Cockerell, 1924
 Andrena blanda Pérez, 1895
 Andrena blennospermatis Thorp, 1969
 Andrena bocensis Donovan, 1977
 Andrena bonasia Warncke, 1969
 Andrena bonivuri Osytshnjuk, 1984
 Andrena boronensis Linsley & MacSwain, 1962
 Andrena boyerella Dours, 1872
 Andrena braccata Viereck, 1907
 Andrena bradleyi Viereck, 1907 – Bradley's miner bee
 Andrena brasiliensis Vachal, 1901
 Andrena braunsiana Friese, 1887
 Andrena brevicornis Bouseman & LaBerge, 1979
 Andrena brevihirtiscopa Hirashima, 1962
 Andrena brevipalpis Cockerell, 1930 – short-tongued miner bee
 Andrena breviscopa Pérez, 1895
 Andrena brooksi Larkin, 2004
 Andrena brumanensis Friese, 1899
 Andrena bruneri Viereck & Cockerell, 1914
 Andrena buccata LaBerge, 1971
 Andrena bucculenta LaBerge & Ribble, 1972
 Andrena bucephala Stephens, 1846
 Andrena buckelli Viereck, 1924 – Buckell's miner bee
 Andrena bulgariensis Warncke, 1965
 Andrena bullata LaBerge, 1967
 Andrena burkelli Bingham, 1908
 Andrena butea Warncke, 1965
 Andrena byrsicola Schmiedeknecht, 1900
 Andrena bytinskii Warncke, 1969

C

 Andrena caerulea Smith, 1879 – caerulean miner bee
 Andrena caeruleonitens Viereck, 1926
 Andrena caesia Warncke, 1974
 Andrena calandra Warncke, 1975
 Andrena californiensis Ribble, 1968
 Andrena caliginosa Viereck, 1916
 Andrena callopyrrha Cockerell, 1929
 Andrena callosa Warncke, 1967
 Andrena calvata LaBerge, 1967
 Andrena camellia Wu, 1977
 Andrena camissoniae Linsley & MacSwain, 1968
 Andrena canadensis Dalla Torre, 1896 – Canada miner bee
 Andrena candida Smith, 1879 – mock-orange miner bee
 Andrena candidiformis Viereck & Cockerell, 1914 – white-haired miner bee
 Andrena caneae Strand, 1915
 Andrena caneibia Strand, 1915
 Andrena canohirta (Friese, 1923)
 Andrena cantiaca Warncke, 1975
 Andrena canuta Warncke, 1975
 Andrena capillosa Morawitz, 1876
 Andrena capillosella Osytshnjuk, 1986
 Andrena capricornis Casad & Cockerell, 1896
 Andrena caprimulga Warncke, 1975
 Andrena cara Nurse, 1904
 Andrena carantonica Pérez, 1902
 Andrena carinata Morawitz, 1877
 Andrena carinifrons Morawitz, 1876
 Andrena carinigena Wu, 1982
 Andrena carlini Cockerell, 1901 – Carlinville miner bee
 Andrena caroli Pérez, 1895
 Andrena carolina Viereck, 1909 – Carolina miner bee
 Andrena carolinensis Mitchell, 1960
 Andrena casadae Cockerell, 1896
 Andrena caspica Morawitz, 1886
 Andrena castanea Warncke, 1975
 Andrena caudata Warncke, 1965
 Andrena ceanothi Viereck, 1917 – ceanothus miner bee
 Andrena ceanothifloris Linsley, 1938 – ceanothus flower miner bee
 Andrena cephalota Xu, 1994
 Andrena cerasifolii Cockerell, 1896 – cherry leaf miner bee
 Andrena cercocarpi Cockerell, 1936
 Andrena cerebrata Mitchell, 1960
 Andrena cervina Warncke, 1975
 Andrena chaetogastra Pittioni, 1950
 Andrena chalcogastra Brullé, 1839
 Andrena chalybaea (Cresson, 1878)
 Andrena chalybioides (Viereck, 1904)
 Andrena chaparralensis Neff & Larkin, 2002
 Andrena chapmanae Viereck, 1904 – Chapman's miner bee
 Andrena chekiangensis Wu, 1977
 Andrena chelma Warncke, 1975
 Andrena chengtehensis Yasumatsu, 1935
 Andrena cheni Dubitzky, 2006
 Andrena chersona Warncke, 1972
 Andrena cheyennorum Viereck & Cockerell, 1914
 Andrena chionospila Cockerell, 1917
 Andrena chippewaensis Mitchell, 1960
 Andrena chirisana Tadauchi, 1992
 Andrena chlorogaster Viereck, 1904 – green-bellied miner bee
 Andrena chlorosoma Linsley & MacSwain, 1961
 Andrena chlorura Cockerell, 1916
 Andrena christineae Dubitzky, 2006
 Andrena chromotricha Cockerell, 1899 – pigmented miner bee
 Andrena chrysochersonesus Baker, 1995
 Andrena chrysopus Pérez, 1903
 Andrena chrysopyga Schenck, 1853
 Andrena chrysosceles (Kirby, 1802)
 Andrena chylismiae Linsley & MacSwain, 1961
 Andrena ciconia Warncke, 1975
 Andrena cineraria (Linnaeus, 1758)
 Andrena cinerea Brullé, 1832
 Andrena cinereophila Warncke, 1965
 Andrena cinnamonea Warncke, 1975
 Andrena citrinihirta Viereck, 1917
 Andrena clarkella (Kirby, 1802) – Clark's miner bee
 Andrena cleodora (Viereck, 1904) – shiny-blue sculptured miner bee
 Andrena clusia Warncke, 1966
 Andrena clypella Strand, 1921
 Andrena coactipostica Viereck, 1917
 Andrena cochlearicalcar Lebedev, 1933
 Andrena coconina LaBerge, 1980
 Andrena coitana (Kirby, 1802)
 Andrena collata Nurse, 1904
 Andrena colletiformis Morawitz, 1874
 Andrena colletina Cockerell, 1906 – plasterer-like miner bee
 Andrena colonialis Morawitz, 1886
 Andrena columbiana Viereck, 1917 – British Columbia miner bee
 Andrena combaella Warncke, 1966
 Andrena combinata (Christ, 1791)
 Andrena combusta Morawitz, 1876
 Andrena commoda Smith, 1879 – advantaged miner bee
 Andrena communis Smith, 1879
 Andrena compositarum Thorp & LaBerge, 2005
 Andrena compta Lepeletier, 1841
 Andrena comptaeformis Gusenleitner & Schwarz, 2000
 Andrena comta Eversmann, 1852
 Andrena concinna Smith, 1853
 Andrena concinnula (Cockerell, 1898)
 Andrena confederata Viereck, 1917
 Andrena congrua LaBerge, 1977
 Andrena congruens Schmiedeknecht, 1884
 Andrena coracina LaBerge & Bouseman, 1970
 Andrena corax Warncke, 1967
 Andrena cordialis Morawitz, 1877
 Andrena cornelli Viereck, 1907
 Andrena coromanda Warncke, 1975
 Andrena corssubalpina Theunert, 2006
 Andrena coruscata LaBerge, 1977
 Andrena costillensis Viereck & Cockerell, 1914
 Andrena cragini Cockerell, 1899
 Andrena crassana Warncke, 1965
 Andrena crassepunctata Cockerell, 1931
 Andrena crataegi Robertson, 1893 – hawthorn miner bee
 Andrena crawfordi Viereck, 1909
 Andrena creberrima Pérez, 1895
 Andrena crecca Warncke, 1965
 Andrena cressonii Robertson, 1891 – dotted miner bee
 Andrena crinita Bouseman & LaBerge, 1979
 Andrena crispa Warncke, 1975
 Andrena cristata Viereck, 1917 – crested miner bee
 Andrena critica Mitchell, 1960
 Andrena crocusella Pisanty & Scheuchl, 2016
 Andrena cruciferarum Ribble, 1974
 Andrena crudeni LaBerge, 1971
 Andrena cryptanthae Timberlake, 1951
 Andrena cryptodonta Cockerell, 1922
 Andrena cubiceps Friese, 1914
 Andrena cubicepsella Warncke, 1975
 Andrena cuneata Warncke, 1974
 Andrena cuneilabris Viereck, 1926 – wedgy-lipped miner bee
 Andrena cupreotincta Cockerell, 1901 – copper-tinted miner bee
 Andrena curiosa (Morawitz, 1877)
 Andrena curtivalvis Morice, 1899
 Andrena curtula Pérez, 1903
 Andrena curvana Warncke, 1965
 Andrena curvungula Thomson, 1870
 Andrena cussariensis Morawitz, 1886
 Andrena cyanomicans Pérez, 1895
 Andrena cyanophila Cockerell, 1906 – dimple-cheeked miner bee
 Andrena cyanosoma (Cockerell, 1916)
 Andrena cybele Gribodo, 1894
 Andrena cymatilis LaBerge, 1987
 Andrena cypria Pittioni, 1950
 Andrena cypricola Mavromoustakis, 1952

D

 Andrena daeckei Viereck, 1907
 Andrena dallasiana Cockerell, 1910
 Andrena damara Warncke, 1968
 Andrena danini Pisanty & Scheuchl, 2016
 Andrena daphanea Warncke, 1974
 Andrena dapsilis LaBerge, 1971
 Andrena dargia Warncke, 1965
 Andrena dauma Warncke, 1969
 Andrena davidsoni Viereck & Cockerell, 1914
 Andrena davisi Viereck, 1907
 Andrena decaocta Warncke, 1967
 Andrena decipiens Schenck, 1861
 Andrena declinis LaBerge, 1977
 Andrena decollata Warncke, 1974
 Andrena decolorata LaBerge & Thorp, 2005
 Andrena delicatula Cockerell, 1918
 Andrena delphiensis Warncke, 1965
 Andrena dentata Smith, 1879
 Andrena denticulata (Kirby, 1802)
 Andrena dentiventris Morawitz, 1874
 Andrena deppeana Cockerell, 1910
 Andrena derbentina Morawitz, 1886
 Andrena deserta Warncke, 1974
 Andrena deserticola Timberlake, 1937
 Andrena dilleri Gusenleitner, 1998
 Andrena dimorpha Mitchell, 1960
 Andrena dinizi Warncke, 1975
 Andrena discophora Morawitz, 1876
 Andrena discors Erichson, 1841
 Andrena discreta Smith, 1879
 Andrena dissimulans Timberlake, 1951
 Andrena dissona Thorp & LaBerge, 2005
 Andrena distans Provancher, 1888 – distant miner bee
 Andrena distinguenda Schenck, 1871
 Andrena djelfensis Pérez, 1895
 Andrena dmitrii Osytshnjuk, 1993
 Andrena dolharubang Tadauchi & Xu, 1997
 Andrena dolini Osytshnjuk, 1979
 Andrena dolomellea Lanham, 1949
 Andrena dolosa Morawitz, 1894
 Andrena dorsalis Brullé, 1832
 Andrena dorsata (Kirby, 1802)
 Andrena doursana Dufour, 1853
 Andrena dreisbachorum LaBerge, 1967
 Andrena dubiosa Kohl, 1905
 Andrena duboisi Timberlake, 1951
 Andrena dunningi Cockerell, 1898 – Dunning's miner bee
 Andrena duplicata Mitchell, 1960
 Andrena durangoensis Viereck & Cockerell, 1914
 Andrena dzynnanica Popov, 1949

E

 Andrena eburneoclypeata Lebedev, 1929
 Andrena echizenia Hirashima & Haneda, 1973
 Andrena edashigei Hirashima, 1960
 Andrena eddaensis Gusenleitner, 1998
 Andrena edwardsi Viereck, 1916 – Edwards's miner bee
 Andrena ehnbergi Morawitz, 1888
 Andrena elata Warncke, 1975
 Andrena elegans Giraud, 1863
 Andrena elisaria Gusenleitner, 1998
 Andrena ellinorae Grünwaldt & Osytshnjuk, 2005
 Andrena ellisiae Cockerell, 1914
 Andrena elmaria Gusenleitner, 1998
 Andrena elongatula Viereck, 1917
 Andrena emeiensis Wu, 1982
 Andrena enocki (Cockerell, 1898)
 Andrena enslinella Stoeckhert, 1924
 Andrena eoa Popov, 1949
 Andrena eothina Linsley & MacSwain, 1961
 Andrena erberi Morawitz, 1871
 Andrena eremnophila Thorp & LaBerge, 2005
 Andrena eremobia Guiglia, 1933
 Andrena erigeniae Robertson, 1891 – spring beauty miner bee
 Andrena ermolenkoi Osytshnjuk, 1984
 Andrena erythrogaster (Ashmead, 1890) – red-bellied miner bee
 Andrena erythronii Robertson, 1891 – trout lily miner bee
 Andrena esakii Hirashima, 1957
 Andrena escondida Cockerell, 1938
 Andrena euphorbiacea Scheuchl, 2005
 Andrena euzona Pérez, 1895
 Andrena everna Warncke, 1974
 Andrena eversmanni Radoszkowski, 1867
 Andrena evoluta Linsley & MacSwain, 1961 – evolving miner bee
 Andrena excellens Viereck, 1924
 Andrena exigua Erichson, 1835
 Andrena exquisita Warncke, 1975
 Andrena ezoensis Hirashima, 1965

F

 Andrena fabalis Warncke, 1966
 Andrena fabrella Pérez, 1903
 Andrena faceta LaBerge, 1987
 Andrena fagopyri Xu & Tadauchi, 2005
 Andrena falcinella Warncke, 1969
 Andrena falsifica Perkins, 1915
 Andrena falsificissima Hirashima, 1966
 Andrena familiaris Smith, 1878
 Andrena fani Xu & Tadauchi, 2000
 Andrena farinosa Pérez, 1895
 Andrena fastuosa Smith, 1879
 Andrena fedtschenkoi Morawitz, 1876
 Andrena fenningeri Viereck, 1922
 Andrena ferghanica Morawitz, 1876
 Andrena ferox Smith, 1847
 Andrena ferrugineicrus Dours, 1872
 Andrena ferrugineipes LaBerge, 1977
 Andrena fertoni Pérez, 1895
 Andrena ferulae Pérez, 1895
 Andrena figurata Morawitz, 1866
 Andrena fimbriata Brullé, 1832
 Andrena fimbriatoides Scheuchl, 2004
 Andrena firuzaensis Popov, 1949
 Andrena flagella Nurse, 1904
 Andrena flaminea LaBerge, 1971
 Andrena flandersi Timberlake, 1937
 Andrena flavipes Panzer, 1799
 Andrena flavitarsis Morawitz, 1876
 Andrena flavobila Warncke, 1965
 Andrena flavofacies Nurse, 1904
 Andrena flavolateralis Xu & Tadauchi, 2000
 Andrena flexa Malloch, 1917
 Andrena flocculosa LaBerge & Ribble, 1972
 Andrena florea Fabricius, 1793
 Andrena florentina Magretti, 1883
 Andrena floricola Eversmann, 1852
 Andrena floridula Smith, 1878
 Andrena florivaga Eversmann, 1852
 Andrena forbesii Robertson, 1891 – Forbes's miner bee
 Andrena formosana Cockerell, 1911
 Andrena forsterella Osytshnjuk, 1978
 Andrena foveolata Hedicke, 1940
 Andrena foveopunctata Alfken, 1932
 Andrena foxii Cockerell, 1898
 Andrena fracta Casad & Cockerell, 1896
 Andrena fragilis Smith, 1853 – fragile miner bee
 Andrena fratercula Warncke, 1975
 Andrena freidbergi Pisanty & Scheuchl, 2018
 Andrena freygessneri Alfken, 1904
 Andrena fria Warncke, 1975
 Andrena frigida Smith, 1853 – cold miner bee
 Andrena fucata Smith, 1847
 Andrena fukaii Cockerell, 1914
 Andrena fukuokensis Hirashima, 1952
 Andrena fulgida LaBerge, 1980 – shiny miner bee
 Andrena fulica Warncke, 1974
 Andrena fuliginata Pérez, 1895
 Andrena fuligula Warncke, 1965
 Andrena fulminea LaBerge, 1967
 Andrena fulminoides LaBerge, 1967
 Andrena fulva (Müller, 1766)
 Andrena fulvago (Christ, 1791)
 Andrena fulvata Stoeckhert, 1930
 Andrena fulvicrista Viereck, 1924
 Andrena fulvida Schenck, 1853
 Andrena fulvipennis Smith, 1853
 Andrena fulvitarsis Brullé, 1832
 Andrena fumida Pérez, 1895
 Andrena fumosa LaBerge, 1967
 Andrena funerea Warncke, 1967
 Andrena furva Linsley & MacSwain, 1961
 Andrena fuscicauda (Viereck, 1904) – brown-tailed miner bee
 Andrena fuscicollis Morawitz, 1876
 Andrena fuscipes (Kirby, 1802)
 Andrena fuscocalcarata Morawitz, 1877
 Andrena fuscosa Erichson, 1835

G

 Andrena galbula Warncke, 1975
 Andrena galilaea Pisanty & Scheuchl, 2018
 Andrena gallica Schmiedeknecht, 1883
 Andrena gallinula Warncke, 1975
 Andrena gamskrucki Warncke, 1965
 Andrena gangcana Xu & Tadauchi, 2000
 Andrena gardineri Cockerell, 1906
 Andrena garrula Warncke, 1965
 Andrena garzetta Warncke, 1975
 Andrena gasparella Patiny, 1998
 Andrena gazella Friese, 1922
 Andrena gelriae van der Vecht, 1927
 Andrena genalis Morawitz, 1880
 Andrena geranii Robertson, 1891 – geranium miner bee
 Andrena gibberis Viereck, 1924 – gibbous miner bee
 Andrena gigantimurus Tadauchi & Xu, 2002
 Andrena glabriventris Alfken, 1935
 Andrena glandaria Warncke, 1975
 Andrena glareola Warncke, 1969
 Andrena glidia Warncke, 1965
 Andrena gloriosa Osytshnjuk, 1993
 Andrena gnaphalii (Cockerell, 1938)
 Andrena gobi Tadauchi & Xu, 2002
 Andrena gordia Warncke, 1975
 Andrena gordoni Ribble, 1974
 Andrena gorkhana Tadauchi & Matsumura, 2007
 Andrena govinda Warncke, 1974
 Andrena gracillima Cameron, 1897
 Andrena graecella Warncke, 1965
 Andrena grandilabris Pérez, 1903
 Andrena granulitergorum Tadauchi & Xu, 2002
 Andrena granulosa Pérez, 1902
 Andrena gravida Imhoff, 1832
 Andrena gregaria Warncke, 1974
 Andrena grindeliae Donovan, 1977
 Andrena griseigena Warncke, 1975
 Andrena griseobalteata Dours, 1872
 Andrena griseohirta Alfken, 1936
 Andrena grossella Grünwaldt, 1976
 Andrena grozdanici Osytshnjuk, 1975
 Andrena guichardi Warncke, 1980
 Andrena gunaca Warncke, 1975
 Andrena gusenleitneri Tadauchi & Xu, 2002
 Andrena gussakovskii Lebedev, 1932
 Andrena guttata Warncke, 1969

H

 Andrena haemorrhoa (Fabricius, 1781)
 Andrena halictoides Smith, 1869
 Andrena hallii Dunning, 1898
 Andrena hamulata LaBerge & Ribble, 1975
 Andrena hanedai Tadauchi, 1985
 Andrena hastulata LaBerge, 1986
 Andrena hattorfiana (Fabricius, 1775)
 Andrena haynesi Viereck & Cockerell, 1914 – Haynes's miner bee
 Andrena hebes Pérez, 1905
 Andrena hedikae Jaeger, 1934
 Andrena hedini Tadauchi & Xu, 2002
 Andrena heinrichi Grünwaldt, 2005
 Andrena heinzi Dubitzky, 2006
 Andrena helenica Warncke, 1965
 Andrena helianthi Robertson, 1891 – sunflower miner bee
 Andrena helianthiformis Viereck & Cockerell, 1914
 Andrena helouanensis Friese, 1899
 Andrena helvola (Linnaeus, 1758)
 Andrena hemileuca Viereck, 1904 – partly-haired miner bee
 Andrena henotica Warncke, 1975
 Andrena hera Nurse, 1904
 Andrena heraclei Robertson, 1897
 Andrena hermonella Scheuchl & Pisanty, 2016
 Andrena hermosa Ribble, 1968
 Andrena hesperia Smith, 1853
 Andrena heteropoda Cockerell, 1922
 Andrena hibernica Warncke, 1975
 Andrena hicksi Cockerell, 1925
 Andrena hieroglyphica Morawitz, 1876
 Andrena hierosolymitana Pisanty & Scheuchl, 2018
 Andrena hikosana Hirashima, 1957
 Andrena hilaris Smith, 1853
 Andrena hillana Warncke, 1968
 Andrena himalayaensis Wu, 1982
 Andrena himalayana Tadauchi & Matsumura, 2007
 Andrena hippotes Robertson, 1895 – Hippotes's miner bee
 Andrena hirashimai Tadauchi, 1985
 Andrena hirsutula Cockerell, 1936
 Andrena hirticincta Provancher, 1888 – hairy-belted miner bee
 Andrena hirticornis Pérez, 1895
 Andrena hispania Warncke, 1967
 Andrena hoffmanni Strand, 1915
 Andrena hondoica Hirashima, 1962
 Andrena hondurasica Cockerell, 1949
 Andrena hova Warncke, 1975
 Andrena humabilis Warncke, 1965
 Andrena humilis Imhoff, 1832
 Andrena humlaensis Scheuchl, 2005
 Andrena hunanensis Wu, 1977
 Andrena hungarica Friese, 1887
 Andrena hurdi Lanham, 1949
 Andrena hyacinthina Mavromoustakis, 1958
 Andrena hybrida Warncke, 1975
 Andrena hyemala Warncke, 1973
 Andrena hypoleuca Cockerell, 1939
 Andrena hypopolia Schmiedeknecht, 1884
 Andrena hystrix Schmiedeknecht, 1883

I

 Andrena icterina Warncke, 1974
 Andrena ignota LaBerge, 1967
 Andrena iliaca Warncke, 1969
 Andrena ilicis Mitchell, 1960
 Andrena illini Bouseman & LaBerge, 1979
 Andrena illinoiensis Robertson, 1891 – tufted miner bee
 Andrena illustris LaBerge, 1977
 Andrena illyrica Warncke, 1975
 Andrena imitatrix Cresson, 1872 – imitator miner bee
 Andrena immaculata Warncke, 1975
 Andrena impolita LaBerge, 1987
 Andrena impuncta Kirby, 1837
 Andrena impunctata Pérez, 1895
 Andrena incanescens Cockerell, 1923
 Andrena incisa Eversmann, 1852
 Andrena inclinata Viereck, 1916
 Andrena incognita Warncke, 1975
 Andrena inconstans Morawitz, 1877
 Andrena inculta LaBerge, 1967
 Andrena induta Morawitz, 1895
 Andrena infirma Morawitz, 1876
 Andrena initialis Morawitz, 1876
 Andrena innesi Gribodo, 1894
 Andrena insignis Warncke, 1974
 Andrena integra Smith, 1853 – intact miner bee
 Andrena intermedia Thomson, 1870
 Andrena iranella Popov, 1940
 Andrena irrasus LaBerge, 1967
 Andrena isabellina Warncke, 1969
 Andrena ishiharai Hirashima, 1953
 Andrena ishii Ribble, 1968
 Andrena ishikawai Hirashima, 1958
 Andrena isis Schmiedeknecht, 1900
 Andrena isocomae Timberlake, 1951
 Andrena ispida Warncke, 1965
 Andrena israelica Scheuchl & Pisanty, 2016

J

 Andrena jakowlewi Morawitz, 1894
 Andrena jalalabadensis Warncke, 1974
 Andrena janthina Warncke, 1975
 Andrena japonica (Smith, 1873)
 Andrena jazleya Pohl & Larkin, 2006
 Andrena jeholensis Yasumatsu, 1935
 Andrena jennei Viereck, 1917
 Andrena jessicae Cockerell, 1896
 Andrena judaea Scheuchl & Pisanty, 2016
 Andrena jugorum Morawitz, 1877

K

 Andrena kaguya Hirashima, 1965
 Andrena kaibabensis Ribble, 1974
 Andrena kalmiae Atwood, 1934 – kalmia miner bee
 Andrena kamarti Schmiedeknecht, 1900
 Andrena kamikochiana Hirashima, 1963
 Andrena kamtschatkaensis Friese, 1914
 Andrena kansuensis Alfken, 1936
 Andrena kathmanduensis Tadauchi & Matsumura, 2007
 Andrena kerriae Hirashima, 1965
 Andrena khabarovi Osytshnjuk, 1986
 Andrena khankensis Osytshnjuk, 1995
 Andrena khasania Osytshnjuk, 1995
 Andrena khosrovi Osytshnjuk, 1993
 Andrena kilikiae Warncke, 1969
 Andrena kintschouensis Hedicke, 1940
 Andrena kirgisica Osytshnjuk, 1994
 Andrena kishidai Yasumatsu, 1935
 Andrena knuthi Alfken, 1900
 Andrena knuthiana Cockerell, 1901 – Knuth's miner bee
 Andrena knuthiformis Hirashima, 1952
 Andrena komachi Hirashima, 1965
 Andrena komarowii Radoszkowski, 1886
 Andrena kondarensis Osytshnjuk, 1982
 Andrena konyella Warncke, 1975
 Andrena kopetica Osytshnjuk, 1993
 Andrena korbella Grünwaldt, 2005
 Andrena koreana Hirashima, 1952
 Andrena korleviciana Friese, 1887
 Andrena kornosica Mavromoustakis, 1954
 Andrena korovini Osytshnjuk, 1986
 Andrena kotenkoi Osytshnjuk, 1994
 Andrena krausiella Gusenleitner, 1998
 Andrena kraussi Michener, 1954
 Andrena kriechbaumeri Schmiedeknecht, 1883
 Andrena krigiana Robertson, 1901
 Andrena kristina Lanham, 1983
 Andrena kryzhanovskii Osytshnjuk, 1993
 Andrena kudiana Cockerell, 1924
 Andrena kumbhuensis Tadauchi & Matsumura, 2007
 Andrena kurda Warncke, 1975

L

 Andrena labergei Ribble, 1968
 Andrena labergeiella Gusenleitner, 1998
 Andrena labialis (Kirby, 1802)
 Andrena labiata Fabricius, 1781
 Andrena labiatula Osytshnjuk, 1993
 Andrena laevis Osytshnjuk, 1983
 Andrena laeviventris Morawitz, 1876
 Andrena laghmana Warncke, 1974
 Andrena lagopus Latreille, 1809
 Andrena lamelliterga Ribble, 1968
 Andrena lamiana Warncke, 1965
 Andrena laminibucca Viereck & Cockerell, 1914 – ridge-mouthed miner bee
 Andrena langadensis Warncke, 1965
 Andrena lanhami LaBerge, 1980
 Andrena lapponica Zetterstedt, 1838
 Andrena lateralis Morawitz, 1876
 Andrena lathyri Alfken, 1899
 Andrena laticalcar Osytshnjuk, 1985
 Andrena laticeps Morawitz, 1877
 Andrena latifrons LaBerge, 1977
 Andrena latigena Wu, 1982
 Andrena latinensis Donovan, 1977
 Andrena lativentris Timberlake, 1951
 Andrena lauracea Robertson, 1897
 Andrena laurivora Warncke, 1974
 Andrena lauta LaBerge, 1977
 Andrena lawrencei Viereck & Cockerell, 1914 – Lawrence's miner bee
 Andrena layiae Timberlake, 1951
 Andrena lazoiana Osytshnjuk, 1995
 Andrena leaena Cameron, 1907
 Andrena ledermanni Schönitzer, 1997
 Andrena legata Nurse, 1904
 Andrena lehmanni Schönitzer, 1997
 Andrena lepida Schenck, 1861
 Andrena lepidii Ribble, 1968
 Andrena leptopyga Pérez, 1895
 Andrena lepurana Warncke, 1974
 Andrena leucocyanea Pérez, 1895
 Andrena leucofimbriata Xu & Tadauchi, 1995
 Andrena leucolippa Pérez, 1895
 Andrena leucomelaena Hedicke, 1940
 Andrena leucomystax Thorp & LaBerge, 2005
 Andrena leucophaea Lepeletier, 1841
 Andrena leucopsis Warncke, 1967
 Andrena leucorhina Morawitz, 1876
 Andrena leucura Warncke, 1974
 Andrena levigata LaBerge, 1967
 Andrena levipes LaBerge, 1967
 Andrena lewisorum Thorp, 1969
 Andrena lijiangensis Wu, 1992
 Andrena lillooetensis Viereck, 1924
 Andrena limassolica Mavromoustakis, 1948
 Andrena limata Smith, 1853
 Andrena limatula LaBerge, 1967
 Andrena limbata Eversmann, 1852
 Andrena limonii Osytshnjuk, 1983
 Andrena lindbergella Pittioni, 1950
 Andrena lineolata Warncke, 1968
 Andrena linsleyana Thorp, 1987
 Andrena linsleyi Timberlake, 1937
 Andrena livens Pérez, 1895
 Andrena livida LaBerge, 1977
 Andrena lomatii Ribble, 1974
 Andrena longibarbis Pérez, 1895
 Andrena longiceps Morawitz, 1895
 Andrena longifovea LaBerge, 1977
 Andrena longitibialis Hirashima, 1962
 Andrena lonicera Warncke, 1973
 Andrena lonicerae Tadauchi & Hirashima, 1988
 Andrena lucidicollis Morawitz, 1876
 Andrena lucidula Warncke, 1974
 Andrena lunata Warncke, 1975
 Andrena lupinorum Cockerell, 1906 – lupine miner bee
 Andrena luridiloma Strand, 1915
 Andrena luscinia Warncke, 1975
 Andrena lutea Warncke, 1967
 Andrena luteihirta Donovan, 1977

M

 Andrena mackieae Cockerell, 1937
 Andrena macoupinensis Robertson, 1900 – Macoupin County miner bee
 Andrena macra Mitchell, 1951
 Andrena macrocephala Cockerell, 1916
 Andrena macroceps (Matsumura, 1912)
 Andrena macroptera Warncke, 1974
 Andrena macswaini Linsley, 1960
 Andrena maculipes Morawitz, 1876
 Andrena maderensis Cockerell, 1922
 Andrena maetai Hirashima, 1964
 Andrena magna Warncke, 1965
 Andrena magnipunctata Kim & Kim, 1989
 Andrena magunta Warncke, 1965
 Andrena maidaqi Scheuchl & Gusenleitner, 2007
 Andrena majalis Morawitz, 1876
 Andrena malacothricidis Thorp, 1969
 Andrena mali Tadauchi & Hirashima, 1987
 Andrena malickyi Gusenleitner & Schwarz, 2000
 Andrena mandibularis Robertson, 1892 – toothed miner bee
 Andrena mangkamensis Wu, 1982
 Andrena manifesta (Fox, 1894)
 Andrena mara Warncke, 1974
 Andrena marginata Fabricius, 1776
 Andrena mariae Robertson, 1891 – Maria miner bee
 Andrena mariana Warncke, 1968
 Andrena mariposorum Viereck, 1917
 Andrena marsae Schmiedeknecht, 1900
 Andrena maukensis Matsumura, 1911
 Andrena medeninensis Pérez, 1895
 Andrena media (Radoszkowski, 1891)
 Andrena mediocalens Cockerell, 1931
 Andrena medionitens Cockerell, 1902 – western red-legged miner bee
 Andrena mediovittata Pérez, 1895
 Andrena melacana Warncke, 1967
 Andrena melaleuca Pérez, 1895
 Andrena melanochroa Cockerell, 1898 – rose miner bee
 Andrena melanospila Cockerell, 1918
 Andrena melanota Warncke, 1975
 Andrena melba Warncke, 1966
 Andrena melittoides Friese, 1899
 Andrena mellea Cresson, 1868
 Andrena melliventris Cresson, 1872
 Andrena menahemella Scheuchl & Pisanty, 2016
 Andrena mendica Mitchell, 1960
 Andrena mentzeliae Cockerell, 1897
 Andrena mephistophelica Cameron, 1897
 Andrena merimna Saunders, 1908
 Andrena meripes Friese, 1922
 Andrena merriami Cockerell, 1901 – Merriam's miner bee
 Andrena merula Warncke, 1969
 Andrena mesillae Cockerell, 1896
 Andrena mesoleuca Cockerell, 1924
 Andrena metallescens Cockerell, 1906
 Andrena metasequoiae Tadauchi & Xu, 2003
 Andrena metuoensis Xu & Tadauchi, 2001
 Andrena mexicana LaBerge, 1967
 Andrena micheneri Ribble, 1968
 Andrena micheneriana LaBerge, 1978
 Andrena micheneriella Gusenleitner & Schwarz, 2000
 Andrena microcardia Pérez, 1895
 Andrena microchlora Cockerell, 1922 – small green miner bee
 Andrena microthorax Pérez, 1895
 Andrena miegiella Dours, 1873
 Andrena mikado Strand & Yasumatsu, 1938
 Andrena mikhaili Osytshnjuk, 1982
 Andrena milwaukeensis Graenicher, 1903 – Milwaukee miner bee
 Andrena mimbresensis Larkin, 2004
 Andrena mimetes Cockerell, 1929
 Andrena minapalumboi Gribodo, 1894
 Andrena miniata LaBerge, 1986
 Andrena minima Warncke, 1974
 Andrena minor (Radoszkowski, 1891)
 Andrena minutissima Osytshnjuk, 1995
 Andrena minutula (Kirby, 1802)
 Andrena minutuloides Perkins, 1914
 Andrena miranda Smith, 1879 – singular miner bee
 Andrena mirzojani Osytshnjuk, 1993
 Andrena misella Timberlake, 1951
 Andrena miserabilis Cresson, 1872 – smooth-faced miner bee
 Andrena mistrensis Grünwaldt, 2005
 Andrena mitakensis Hirashima, 1963
 Andrena mitis Schmiedeknecht, 1883
 Andrena miyamotoi Hirashima, 1964
 Andrena mocsaryi Schmiedeknecht, 1884
 Andrena mohavensis Ribble, 1974
 Andrena mojavensis Linsley & MacSwain, 1955
 Andrena mollissima Warncke, 1975
 Andrena monacha Warncke, 1965
 Andrena mongolica Morawitz, 1880
 Andrena monilia Warncke, 1967
 Andrena monilicornis Cockerell, 1896
 Andrena monoensis LaBerge, 1980
 Andrena monogonoparia Viereck, 1917
 Andrena montana Warncke, 1973
 Andrena montanula Osytshnjuk, 1986
 Andrena montarca Warncke, 1975
 Andrena monticola LaBerge, 1967
 Andrena montrosensis Viereck & Cockerell, 1914
 Andrena moquiorum Viereck & Cockerell, 1914
 Andrena mordax Morawitz, 1876
 Andrena moricei Friese, 1899
 Andrena morinella Warncke, 1975
 Andrena morio Brullé, 1832
 Andrena morosa Cameron, 1897
 Andrena morrisonella Viereck, 1917 – Morrison's miner bee
 Andrena mucida Kriechbaumer, 1873
 Andrena mucorea Morawitz, 1876
 Andrena mucronata Morawitz, 1871
 Andrena munakatai Tadauchi, 1985
 Andrena murana Warncke, 1967
 Andrena murietae Ribble, 1968
 Andrena murreensis Cockerell, 1923
 Andrena muscaria Warncke, 1965
 Andrena musica Gusenleitner, 1998
 Andrena mutini Osytshnjuk, 1986

N

 Andrena najadana Warncke, 1975
 Andrena nana (Kirby, 1802)
 Andrena nanaeformis Noskiewicz, 1925
 Andrena nanshanica Popov, 1940
 Andrena nantouensis Dubitzky, 2006
 Andrena nanula Nylander, 1848
 Andrena nasica Lebedev, 1933
 Andrena nasipolita Strand, 1913
 Andrena nasonii Robertson, 1895 – bumped miner bee
 Andrena nasuta Giraud, 1863
 Andrena nativa Osytshnjuk, 1984
 Andrena nawai Cockerell, 1913
 Andrena nebularia Warncke, 1975
 Andrena neffi Larkin, 2004
 Andrena negevana Gusenleitner & Scheuchl, 2000
 Andrena nemophilae Ribble, 1968
 Andrena neocypriaca Mavromoustakis, 1956
 Andrena neomexicana LaBerge, 1967
 Andrena neonana Viereck, 1917
 Andrena neovirida Grünwaldt, 2005
 Andrena nesterovi Osytshnjuk, 1982
 Andrena nesteroviella Osytshnjuk, 1993
 Andrena nevadae Linsley & MacSwain, 1961
 Andrena nevadensis (Cresson, 1879) – long-faced miner bee
 Andrena nida Mitchell, 1960
 Andrena nigerrima Casad, 1896
 Andrena nigra Provancher, 1895
 Andrena nigrae Robertson, 1905 – black miner bee
 Andrena nigriceps (Kirby, 1802)
 Andrena nigricula LaBerge & Bouseman, 1977
 Andrena nigrihirta (Ashmead, 1890) – black-haired miner bee
 Andrena nigripes Provancher, 1895
 Andrena nigritula Cockerell, 1906
 Andrena nigroaenea (Kirby, 1802)
 Andrena nigrocaerulea Cockerell, 1897 – black and blue miner bee
 Andrena nigroclypeata Linsley, 1939
 Andrena nigrocyanea Saunders, 1908
 Andrena nigroolivacea Dours, 1873
 Andrena nigroviridula Dours, 1873
 Andrena nilotica Warncke, 1967
 Andrena nippon Tadauchi & Hirashima, 1983
 Andrena nisoria Warncke, 1969
 Andrena nitida (Müller, 1776)
 Andrena nitidicollis Morawitz, 1876
 Andrena nitidilabris Pérez, 1895
 Andrena nitidiuscula Schenck, 1853
 Andrena nitidula Pérez, 1903
 Andrena nivalis Smith, 1853 – snow miner bee
 Andrena niveata Friese, 1887
 Andrena niveimonticola Xu & Tadauchi, 1999
 Andrena niveobarbata Nurse, 1904
 Andrena nobilis Morawitz, 1874
 Andrena nothocalaidis (Cockerell, 1905) – false dandelion miner bee
 Andrena nothoscordi Robertson, 1897
 Andrena notophila Cockerell, 1933
 Andrena nova Popov, 1940
 Andrena nubecula Smith, 1853 – cloudy-winged miner bee
 Andrena nubica Warncke, 1975
 Andrena nucleola Warncke, 1973
 Andrena nuda Robertson, 1891 – naked miner bee
 Andrena nudigastroides Yasumatsu, 1935
 Andrena numida Lepeletier, 1841
 Andrena nupta Morawitz, 1876
 Andrena nuptialis Pérez, 1902
 Andrena nycthemera Imhoff, 1868

O

 Andrena oblita Warncke, 1967
 Andrena obscuripennis Smith, 1853
 Andrena obscuripostica Viereck, 1916
 Andrena ochropa Warncke, 1974
 Andrena oedicnema Warncke, 1975
 Andrena oenas Warncke, 1975
 Andrena oenotherae Timberlake, 1937
 Andrena ofella LaBerge, 1967
 Andrena okabei Hirashima, 1957
 Andrena okinawana Matsumura & Uchida, 1926
 Andrena olivacea Viereck, 1916
 Andrena olympica Grünwaldt, 2005
 Andrena omninigra Viereck, 1917
 Andrena omogensis Hirashima, 1953
 Andrena oniscicolor (Viereck, 1904)
 Andrena opacifovea Hirashima, 1952
 Andrena opercula Wu, 1982
 Andrena optanda LaBerge, 1967
 Andrena oralis Morawitz, 1876
 Andrena orana Warncke, 1975
 Andrena orbitalis Morawitz, 1871
 Andrena orchidea Scheuchl, 2005
 Andrena orientaliella Osytshnjuk, 1986
 Andrena orientana Warncke, 1965
 Andrena orizabibia Strand, 1917
 Andrena ornata Morawitz, 1866
 Andrena orthocarpi Cockerell, 1936
 Andrena osmioides Cockerell, 1916
 Andrena osychniukae Osytshnjuk, 1977
 Andrena osytschnjukae Tadauchi & Xu, 2000
 Andrena oulskii Radoszkowski, 1867
 Andrena ounifa Warncke, 1974
 Andrena ovatula (Kirby, 1802)
 Andrena oviventris Pérez, 1895

P

 Andrena pachucensis Donovan, 1977
 Andrena padoucorum Viereck & Cockerell, 1914
 Andrena paganettina Warncke, 1965
 Andrena pagophila Warncke, 1975
 Andrena palaestina Pisanty & Scheuchl, 2016
 Andrena pallidicincta Brullé, 1832
 Andrena pallidifovea (Viereck, 1904) – pale-faced miner bee
 Andrena pallidiscopa (Viereck, 1904)
 Andrena pallitarsis Pérez, 1903
 Andrena palpalis Timberlake, 1951
 Andrena palumba Warncke, 1974
 Andrena pandellei Pérez, 1895
 Andrena pandosa Warncke, 1968
 Andrena panfilovi Osytshnjuk, 1984
 Andrena pannosa Morawitz, 1876
 Andrena panurgimorpha Mavromoustakis, 1957
 Andrena panurgina De Stefani, 1887
 Andrena papagorum Viereck & Cockerell, 1914
 Andrena parachalybea Viereck, 1917
 Andrena paradisaea Warncke, 1975
 Andrena paradoxa Friese, 1921
 Andrena parathoracica Hirashima, 1957
 Andrena paraulica Hedicke, 1940
 Andrena pareklisiae Mavromoustakis, 1957
 Andrena parilis LaBerge, 1967
 Andrena parnassiae Cockerell, 1902
 Andrena parviceps Kriechbaumer, 1873
 Andrena passerina Warncke, 1974
 Andrena pastellensis Schwenninger, 2007
 Andrena patagiata LaBerge, 1987
 Andrena patella Nurse, 1903
 Andrena paucisquama Noskiewicz, 1924
 Andrena pavonia Warncke, 1974
 Andrena peckhami Cockerell, 1902 – Peckham's miner bee
 Andrena pecosana Cockerell, 1913
 Andrena pectidis (Cockerell, 1897)
 Andrena pectilis LaBerge, 1986
 Andrena pela Warncke, 1974
 Andrena pellucens Pérez, 1895
 Andrena pellucida Warncke, 1974
 Andrena pelopa Warncke, 1975
 Andrena penemisella LaBerge & Ribble, 1975
 Andrena pensilis Timberlake, 1938
 Andrena penutiani Ribble, 1968
 Andrena perahia Pisanty & Scheuchl, 2016
 Andrena perarmata Cockerell, 1898 – armed miner bee
 Andrena perezana Viereck & Cockerell, 1914
 Andrena peridonea Cockerell, 1920
 Andrena perimelas Cockerell, 1905
 Andrena perplexa Smith, 1853 – perplexed miner bee
 Andrena perpunctata LaBerge, 1967
 Andrena persimulata Viereck, 1917 – protuberance miner bee
 Andrena personata Robertson, 1897
 Andrena pertristis Cockerell, 1905 – sad miner bee
 Andrena pesenkoi Osytshnjuk, 1984
 Andrena peshinica Nurse, 1904
 Andrena pesleria Gusenleitner, 1998
 Andrena petrosa Warncke, 1974
 Andrena phaceliae Mitchell, 1960
 Andrena phaneroleuca Cockerell, 1929
 Andrena phenax Cockerell, 1898
 Andrena phoenicura Warncke, 1975
 Andrena pieli Xu & Tadauchi, 1995
 Andrena pilipes Fabricius, 1781
 Andrena pinkeunia Warncke, 1969
 Andrena piperi Viereck, 1904 – Piper's miner bee
 Andrena placata Mitchell, 1960 – peaceful miner bee
 Andrena plana Viereck, 1904
 Andrena planirostris Morawitz, 1876
 Andrena planiventris Dours, 1872
 Andrena planti Dubitzky, 2006
 Andrena platalea Warncke, 1975
 Andrena platydepressa Tadauchi & Xu, 1995
 Andrena platyparia Robertson, 1895 – plated miner bee
 Andrena platyrhina Cockerell, 1930
 Andrena plebeia LaBerge, 1986
 Andrena plumiscopa Timberlake, 1951
 Andrena plumosella Gusenleitner & Schwarz, 2002
 Andrena polemediana Mavromoustakis, 1956
 Andrena polemonii Robertson, 1891
 Andrena polita Smith, 1847
 Andrena ponomarevae Osytshnjuk, 1983
 Andrena pontica Warncke, 1972
 Andrena popovi Osytshnjuk, 1985
 Andrena porterae Cockerell, 1900 – Porter's miner bee
 Andrena potentillae Panzer, 1809
 Andrena praecocella Cockerell, 1917
 Andrena praecox (Scopoli, 1763)
 Andrena pratincola Warncke, 1974
 Andrena prima Casad, 1896
 Andrena primaeva Cockerell, 1909
 Andrena primulifrons Casad, 1896
 Andrena principalis LaBerge, 1986
 Andrena probata Warncke, 1973
 Andrena producta Warncke, 1973
 Andrena prolixa LaBerge, 1980
 Andrena prostomias Pérez, 1905
 Andrena proxima (Kirby, 1802)
 Andrena pruinosa Erichson, 1835
 Andrena prunella Warncke, 1974
 Andrena pruni Robertson, 1891
 Andrena prunifloris Cockerell, 1898
 Andrena prunorum Cockerell, 1896 – purple miner bee
 Andrena pseudocineraria Wu, 1982
 Andrena pseudothoracica Engel, 2005
 Andrena puffina Warncke, 1975
 Andrena pulicaria Warncke, 1975
 Andrena pullipennis Alfken, 1931
 Andrena pulverea Viereck, 1916
 Andrena pulverulenta Viereck, 1904
 Andrena punctatissima Morawitz, 1866
 Andrena punctifrons Morawitz, 1876
 Andrena punctiventris Morawitz, 1876
 Andrena punjabensis Cameron, 1908
 Andrena purpurascens Pérez, 1895
 Andrena purpureomicans Alfken, 1935
 Andrena pusilla Pérez, 1903
 Andrena puthua (Cockerell, 1910)
 Andrena pyropygia Kriechbaumer, 1873
 Andrena pyrozonata Friese, 1921
 Andrena pyrrhula Pérez, 1895

Q

 Andrena qinhaiensis Xu, 1994
 Andrena quadrifasciata Morawitz, 1876
 Andrena quadrilimbata LaBerge, 1977
 Andrena quadrimaculata Friese, 1921
 Andrena quercina Cockerell, 1939
 Andrena querquedula Warncke, 1975
 Andrena quettensis Cockerell, 1917
 Andrena quinquepalpa Warncke, 1980
 Andrena quintiliformis Viereck, 1916 – western scaly miner bee
 Andrena quintilis Robertson, 1898 – eastern scaly miner bee
 Andrena qusumensis Wu, 1982

R

 Andrena ramaleyi Cockerell, 1931
 Andrena ramayana Tadauchi & Matsumura, 2007
 Andrena ramlehiana Pérez, 1903
 Andrena ranunculi Schmiedeknecht, 1883
 Andrena ranunculorum Morawitz, 1877
 Andrena rava LaBerge, 1967
 Andrena raveni Linsley & MacSwain, 1961
 Andrena recurvirostra Warncke, 1975
 Andrena reflexa Cresson, 1872
 Andrena regularis Malloch, 1917 – regular miner bee
 Andrena rehni Viereck, 1907 – Rehn's miner bee
 Andrena relata Warncke, 1967
 Andrena repanda LaBerge, 1967
 Andrena reperta Warncke, 1974
 Andrena resoluta Warncke, 1973
 Andrena revelstokensis Viereck, 1924
 Andrena rhenana Stoeckhert, 1930
 Andrena rhypara Pérez, 1903
 Andrena rhyssonota Pérez, 1895
 Andrena ribblei LaBerge, 1977
 Andrena richardsi Hirashima, 1957
 Andrena robertsonii Dalla Torre, 1896 – Robertson's miner bee
 Andrena robervalensis Mitchell, 1960
 Andrena robinsoni Lanham, 1987
 Andrena robusta Warncke, 1975
 Andrena rodilla Donovan, 1977
 Andrena rogenhoferi Morawitz, 1872
 Andrena romankovae Osytshnjuk, 1995
 Andrena roripae Osytshnjuk, 1993
 Andrena rosae Panzer, 1801
 Andrena roscipes Alfken, 1933
 Andrena rothneyi Cameron, 1897
 Andrena rotundata Pérez, 1895
 Andrena rotundilabris Morawitz, 1877
 Andrena rozeni Linsley & MacSwain, 1955
 Andrena rubecula Warncke, 1974
 Andrena rubens LaBerge, 1967
 Andrena rubi Mitchell, 1960
 Andrena rubrotincta Linsley, 1938
 Andrena rudbeckiae Robertson, 1891
 Andrena rudolfae Osytshnjuk, 1986
 Andrena rufescens Pérez, 1895
 Andrena ruficrus Nylander, 1848
 Andrena rufina Morawitz, 1876
 Andrena rufitibialis Friese, 1899
 Andrena rufiventris Lepeletier, 1841
 Andrena rufizona Imhoff, 1834
 Andrena rufoclypeata Alfken, 1936
 Andrena rufomaculata Friese, 1921
 Andrena rufosignata Cockerell, 1902 – red-faced miner bee
 Andrena rufula Schmiedeknecht, 1883
 Andrena rugosa Robertson, 1891 – wrinkled miner bee
 Andrena rugothorace Warncke, 1965
 Andrena rugulosa Stoeckhert, 1935
 Andrena rugulosella Osytshnjuk, 1993
 Andrena runcinatae Cockerell, 1906 – planed miner bee
 Andrena rupshuensis Cockerell, 1911
 Andrena russula Lepeletier, 1841
 Andrena rusticola Warncke, 1975

S

 Andrena saccata Viereck, 1904 – shifty miner bee
 Andrena saegeri Cockerell, 1939
 Andrena saettana Warncke, 1975
 Andrena sagarmathana Tadauchi & Matsumura, 2007
 Andrena sagittagalea Ribble, 1968
 Andrena sagittaria Warncke, 1968
 Andrena sakagamii Tadauchi, Hirashima & Matsumura, 1987
 Andrena salicifloris Cockerell, 1897 – willow flower miner bee
 Andrena salicina Morawitz, 1877
 Andrena salictaria Robertson, 1905 – small willow miner bee
 Andrena sandanskia Warncke, 1973
 Andrena santaclarae Ribble, 1974
 Andrena saragamineensis Hirashima, 1962
 Andrena sardoa Lepeletier, 1841
 Andrena sarta Morawitz, 1876
 Andrena sarydzhasi Osytshnjuk, 2005
 Andrena sasakii Cockerell, 1913
 Andrena satellita Nurse, 1904
 Andrena saturata Warncke, 1975
 Andrena savignyi Spinola, 1838
 Andrena saxonica Stoeckhert, 1935
 Andrena sayi Robertson, 1891
 Andrena schencki Morawitz, 1866
 Andrena scheuchli Dubitzky, 2006
 Andrena schlettereri Friese, 1896
 Andrena schmiedeknechti Magretti, 1883
 Andrena schoenitzeri Gusenleitner, 1998
 Andrena schuberthi Gusenleitner, 1998
 Andrena schuhi LaBerge, 1980 – Schuhi's miner bee
 Andrena schulzi Strand, 1921
 Andrena schwarzi Warncke, 1975
 Andrena scita Eversmann, 1852
 Andrena scotica Perkins, 1916
 Andrena scotoptera Cockerell, 1934
 Andrena sculleni LaBerge, 1967
 Andrena scurra Viereck, 1904 – joker miner bee
 Andrena scutellaris Morawitz, 1880
 Andrena scutellinitens Viereck, 1916 – shielded miner bee
 Andrena sedentaria Warncke, 1975
 Andrena sedumella Scheuchl & Pisanty, 2018
 Andrena segregans Cockerell, 1900
 Andrena segregata Osytshnjuk, 1982
 Andrena seitzi Alfken, 1935
 Andrena selcuki Scheuchl & Hazir, 2008
 Andrena selena Gusenleitner, 1994
 Andrena semiaenea Morawitz, 1876
 Andrena semiflava Lebedev, 1932
 Andrena semifulva Viereck, 1916
 Andrena semilaevis Pérez, 1903
 Andrena seminuda Friese, 1896
 Andrena semipunctata Cockerell, 1902
 Andrena semirubra Morawitz, 1876
 Andrena semirugosa Cockerell, 1924
 Andrena senecionis Pérez, 1895
 Andrena senex Eversmann, 1852
 Andrena senticulosa LaBerge, 1967
 Andrena sericata Imhoff, 1868
 Andrena serraticornis Warncke, 1965
 Andrena setosifemoralis Wu, 2000
 Andrena sexguttata Morawitz, 1877
 Andrena shakuensis Popov, 1949
 Andrena shawanensis Xu & Tadauchi, 1999
 Andrena shoshoni Ribble, 1974
 Andrena shteinbergi Osytshnjuk, 1993
 Andrena sibirica Morawitz, 1888
 Andrena sibthorpi Mavromoustakis, 1952
 Andrena siccata LaBerge, 1986
 Andrena siciliana Warncke, 1980
 Andrena sieverti Cockerell, 1906
 Andrena sigiella Gusenleitner, 1998
 Andrena sigmundi Cockerell, 1902 – Sigmund's miner bee
 Andrena signata Warncke, 1974
 Andrena sillata Warncke, 1975
 Andrena similis Smith, 1849
 Andrena simillima Smith, 1851
 Andrena simontornyella Noskiewicz, 1939
 Andrena simplex Smith, 1853 – simple miner bee
 Andrena simulata Smith, 1879
 Andrena singularis Viereck, 1924
 Andrena sinuata Pérez, 1895
 Andrena sitiliae Viereck, 1909
 Andrena sjunthensis Osytshnjuk, 1984
 Andrena skorikovi Popov, 1940
 Andrena sladeni Viereck, 1924 – Sladen's miner bee
 Andrena smaragdina Morawitz, 1876
 Andrena sobrina Warncke, 1975
 Andrena sodalis Smith, 1879
 Andrena sola Viereck, 1916 – lonely miner bee
 Andrena solenopalpa Benoist, 1945
 Andrena solidago Tadauchi & Xu, 2002
 Andrena solitaria Warncke, 1975
 Andrena solivaga LaBerge, 1967
 Andrena solutiscopa Scheuchl, 2005
 Andrena sonorensis LaBerge, 1967
 Andrena sordidella Viereck, 1918
 Andrena soror Dours, 1872
 Andrena speciosa Friese, 1899
 Andrena specularia Donovan, 1977
 Andrena sperryi (Cockerell, 1937)
 Andrena sphaeralceae Linsley, 1939
 Andrena sphecodimorpha Hedicke, 1942
 Andrena spinaria Warncke, 1974
 Andrena spiraeana Robertson, 1895 – goatsbeard miner bee
 Andrena splendidicollis Morawitz, 1895
 Andrena splendula Osytshnjuk, 1984
 Andrena spolata Warncke, 1968
 Andrena spreta Pérez, 1895
 Andrena squamata Wu, 1990
 Andrena stabiana Morice, 1899
 Andrena stagei Linsley & MacSwain, 1962
 Andrena statusa Gusenleitner, 1998
 Andrena steini Tadauchi & Xu, 2003
 Andrena stellaris Warncke, 1965
 Andrena stenofovea Scheuchl & Pisanty, 2018
 Andrena stepposa Osytshnjuk, 1977
 Andrena stigmatica Morawitz, 1895
 Andrena stipator LaBerge, 1971
 Andrena stoeckhertella Pittioni, 1948
 Andrena stolida Warncke, 1975
 Andrena stragulata Illiger, 1806
 Andrena strepera Warncke, 1975
 Andrena striata Wu, 1977
 Andrena striatifrons Cockerell, 1897 – line-faced miner bee
 Andrena strohmella Illiger, 1806
 Andrena suavis Timberlake, 1938
 Andrena subaenescens Morawitz, 1876
 Andrena subapasta Thorp, 1969
 Andrena subaustralis Cockerell, 1898 – southern miner bee
 Andrena subchalybea Viereck, 1916
 Andrena subconsobrina Popov, 1949
 Andrena subdepressa Timberlake, 1951
 Andrena sublayiae LaBerge & Bouseman, 1970
 Andrena sublevigata Hirashima, 1966
 Andrena sublisterelle Wu, 1982
 Andrena submaura Linsley, 1938
 Andrena submediocalens Wu, 1982
 Andrena submoesta Viereck, 1916
 Andrena submontana Wu, 1982
 Andrena subnigripes Viereck, 1916
 Andrena subniveata Osytshnjuk, 1993
 Andrena subnivosa Wu, 1982
 Andrena subopaca Nylander, 1848
 Andrena subopercula Wu, 1982
 Andrena subproximana Strand, 1913
 Andrena subrubicunda LaBerge, 1986
 Andrena subshawella Strand, 1915
 Andrena subsmaragdina Osytshnjuk, 1984
 Andrena subspinigera Cockerell, 1917
 Andrena subsquamiformis Tadauchi & Xu, 2000
 Andrena subtilis Smith, 1879 – subtle miner bee
 Andrena subtrita Cockerell, 1910 – unusual miner bee
 Andrena subvelutina Xu & Tadauchi, 1995
 Andrena suerinensis Friese, 1884
 Andrena sulcata Donovan, 1977
 Andrena surda Cockerell, 1910 – deaf miner bee
 Andrena susanneae Dubitzky, 2006
 Andrena susterai Alfken, 1914
 Andrena sylvatica Morawitz, 1877
 Andrena symphyti Schmiedeknecht, 1883
 Andrena synadelpha Perkins, 1914

T

 Andrena tadauchii Gusenleitner, 1998
 Andrena tadorna Warncke, 1974
 Andrena tadzhica Popov, 1949
 Andrena taeniata Viereck, 1916
 Andrena taisetsusana Tadauchi & Hirashima, 1987
 Andrena taiwanella Dubitzky, 2002
 Andrena takachihoi Hirashima, 1964
 Andrena talina Xu & Tadauchi, 2002
 Andrena taniguchiae Hirashima, 1958
 Andrena taprobana Warncke, 1975
 Andrena taraxaci Giraud, 1861
 Andrena tarsata Nylander, 1848
 Andrena tateyamana Tamasana & Hirashima, 1984
 Andrena tatjanae Osytshnjuk, 1995
 Andrena taxana Warncke, 1975
 Andrena tecta Radoszkowski, 1876
 Andrena tegularis LaBerge, 1967
 Andrena tenuiformis Pittioni, 1950
 Andrena tenuis Morawitz, 1877
 Andrena tenuistriata Pérez, 1895
 Andrena tertaria Meunier, 1920
 Andrena testaceipes Saunders, 1908
 Andrena tetonorum Viereck & Cockerell, 1914
 Andrena teunisseni Gusenleitner, 1998
 Andrena texana Cresson, 1872
 Andrena thaspii Graenicher, 1903 – parsnip miner bee
 Andrena thomensis Cockerell, 1932
 Andrena thomsonii Ducke, 1898
 Andrena thoracica (Fabricius, 1775)
 Andrena tianshana Tadauchi & Xu, 1995
 Andrena tiaretta Warncke, 1974
 Andrena tibetensis Wu, 1982
 Andrena tibetica Xu & Tadauchi, 2005
 Andrena tibialis (Kirby, 1802)
 Andrena tildeni Ribble, 1974
 Andrena timberlakei Cockerell, 1929
 Andrena tinaria Gusenleitner, 1998
 Andrena tkalcui Gusenleitner & Schwarz, 2002
 Andrena tobiasi Osytshnjuk, 1983
 Andrena toelgiana Friese, 1921
 Andrena togashii Tadauchi & Hirashima, 1984
 Andrena toluca LaBerge, 1969
 Andrena tomentosa Morawitz, 1878
 Andrena tomora Warncke, 1975
 Andrena tonkaworum Viereck, 1917
 Andrena topazana Cockerell, 1906 – Topaz miner bee
 Andrena toralis LaBerge & Ribble, 1972
 Andrena torda Warncke, 1965
 Andrena torulosa LaBerge, 1971
 Andrena totana Warncke, 1974
 Andrena transbaicalica Popov, 1949
 Andrena transhissarica Popov, 1958
 Andrena transitoria Morawitz, 1871
 Andrena transnigra Viereck, 1904 – black-banded miner bee
 Andrena trapezoidea Viereck, 1917
 Andrena trapezoidina Viereck & Cockerell, 1914
 Andrena trevoris Cockerell, 1897 – Trevor's miner bee
 Andrena tridens Robertson, 1902 – trident miner bee
 Andrena tridentata (Kirby, 1802)
 Andrena trikalensis Warncke, 1965
 Andrena trimaculata LaBerge, 1967
 Andrena trimarginata (Radoszkowski, 1886)
 Andrena trimmerana (Kirby, 1802)
 Andrena tringa Warncke, 1973
 Andrena tringoides Osytshnjuk, 1993
 Andrena trinkoi Osytshnjuk, 1984
 Andrena triquestra LaBerge, 1986
 Andrena trivialis Viereck, 1917
 Andrena trizonata (Ashmead, 1890) – three-zoned miner bee
 Andrena troodica Warncke, 1975
 Andrena truncatella Xu & Tadauchi, 1999
 Andrena truncatilabris Morawitz, 1877
 Andrena tscheki Morawitz, 1872
 Andrena tsingtauica Strand, 1915
 Andrena tsukubana Hirashima, 1957
 Andrena tuberculifera Pérez, 1895
 Andrena tunetana Schmiedeknecht, 1900
 Andrena turanica Osytshnjuk, 1993
 Andrena turkestana Warncke, 1967

U

 Andrena uluhbeki Osytshnjuk, 1984
 Andrena ulula Warncke, 1969
 Andrena ungeri Mavromoustakis, 1952
 Andrena unicincta Friese, 1899
 Andrena unicostata LaBerge, 1971
 Andrena unita Nurse, 1904
 Andrena urarti Osytshnjuk, 1993
 Andrena urdula Warncke, 1965
 Andrena utahensis LaBerge, 1967
 Andrena uvulariae Mitchell, 1960
 Andrena uyacensis Cockerell, 1949

V

 Andrena vacella Warncke, 1975
 Andrena vachali Pérez, 1895
 Andrena vaga Panzer, 1799
 Andrena valentinae Osytshnjuk, 1993
 Andrena valeriana Hirashima, 1957
 Andrena vanduzeei Linsley, 1938
 Andrena vandykei Cockerell, 1936
 Andrena varia Pérez, 1895
 Andrena variabilis Smith, 1853
 Andrena varians (Kirby, 1802)
 Andrena varicornis Pérez, 1895
 Andrena varsobiana Osytshnjuk, 1986
 Andrena vaulogeri Pérez, 1895
 Andrena venata LaBerge & Ribble, 1975
 Andrena venerabilis Alfken, 1935
 Andrena ventralis Imhoff, 1832
 Andrena ventricosa Dours, 1873
 Andrena verae Osytshnjuk, 1986
 Andrena verbesinae Viereck & Cockerell, 1914
 Andrena verecunda Cresson, 1872
 Andrena verticalis Pérez, 1895
 Andrena vespertina Linsley & MacSwain, 1961
 Andrena vestali Cockerell, 1913
 Andrena vetula Lepeletier, 1841
 Andrena viciae Tadauchi & Xu, 2000
 Andrena vicina Smith, 1853 – neighbouring miner bee
 Andrena vicinoides Viereck, 1904 – Victoria miner bee
 Andrena vidalesi Cockerell, 1949
 Andrena vierecki Cockerell, 1904 – Viereck's miner bee
 Andrena viktorovi Osytshnjuk, 1983
 Andrena villipes Pérez, 1895
 Andrena vinnula LaBerge & Hurd, 1965
 Andrena violae Robertson, 1891
 Andrena virago Morawitz, 1895
 Andrena virescens Morawitz, 1876
 Andrena virgata Warncke, 1975
 Andrena virginiana Mitchell, 1960 – Virginia miner bee
 Andrena viridescens Viereck, 1916
 Andrena viridigastra Morawitz, 1876
 Andrena viridissima Ribble, 1968
 Andrena vitiosa Smith, 1879
 Andrena vogleri Larkin, 2004
 Andrena volgensis Osytshnjuk, 1994
 Andrena volka Warncke, 1969
 Andrena vulcana Dours, 1873
 Andrena vulpecula Kriechbaumer, 1873
 Andrena vulpicolor Cockerell, 1897
 Andrena vulpoides LaBerge, 1967

W

 Andrena w-scripta Viereck, 1904 – w-marked miner bee
 Andrena waldmerei LaBerge & Bouseman, 1970
 Andrena walleyi Cockerell, 1932 – Walley's miner bee
 Andrena warnckei Gusenleitner & Schwarz, 2000
 Andrena washingtoni Cockerell, 1901 – Washington miner bee
 Andrena watasei Cockerell, 1913
 Andrena wellesleyana Robertson, 1897 – Wellesley's miner bee
 Andrena westensis Warncke, 1965
 Andrena westrichi Gusenleitner & Schwarz, 2000
 Andrena wheeleri Graenicher, 1904
 Andrena wilhelmi Schuberth, 1995
 Andrena wilkella (Kirby, 1802) – European legume miner bee
 Andrena wilmattae Cockerell, 1906
 Andrena winnemuccana LaBerge, 1973
 Andrena wolfi Gusenleitner & Scheuchl, 2000
 Andrena wollastoni Cockerell, 1922
 Andrena wuae Tadauchi & Xu, 1995

X

 Andrena xanthigera Cockerell, 1900
 Andrena xinjiangensis Wu, 1985
 Andrena xiyuensis Xu & Tadauchi, 2005
 Andrena xuanzangi Tadauchi & Xu, 2003

Y

 Andrena yamato Tadauchi & Hirashima, 1983
 Andrena yangi Dubitzky, 2006
 Andrena yasumatsui Hirashima, 1952
 Andrena yelkouan Warncke, 1975
 Andrena yukawai Tadauchi & Xu, 2004
 Andrena yunnanica Xu & Tadauchi, 2002

Z

 Andrena zaaminensis Osytshnjuk, 1986
 Andrena zharkolia Osytshnjuk, 1994
 Andrena zhelokhovtzevi Osytshnjuk, 1993
 Andrena ziminae Osytshnjuk, 1986
 Andrena zionensis LaBerge, 1973
 Andrena ziziae Robertson, 1891
 Andrena ziziaeformis Cockerell, 1908
 Andrena zlatae Osytshnjuk, 1993
 Andrena zostera Warncke, 1975
 Andrena zuvandiana Osytshnjuk, 1994

References 

 Biolib
 Universal Biological Indexer

Andrena